Zengin (Zengîn) is a   Kurdish and Turkish first or a surname. In Kurdish it is mostly the first name, while in Turkish it is more common to be a surname. Other variations of it are Zangin and Zangîn. Notable people with the surname include:

 Erkan Zengin, Swedish footballer of Turkish descent
 İbrahim Zengin, Turkish wrestler
 Kerim Zengin, Turkish footballer
 Muhammet Oǧuz Zengin, Turkish curler
 Suzan Zengin (1959 –  2011), Turkish journalist, translator and human rights activist
 Tolga Zengin, Turkish footballer

 Zengin (banking), the payment clearing network used by Japanese banks (akin the automated clearing house system used in the United States)

Turkish-language surnames